Moritz Hartmann (born 20 June 1986) is a German footballer who plays for SV Rhenania Bessenich. He joined the club in 2018 after a lengthy spell at Ingolstadt. In July 2020 Moritz Hartman signed a contract at SV Rhenania Bessenich, in Germany's 8th division.

Career

Kickers Offenbach
On 30 August 2019, Hartmann joined Kickers Offenbach on a contract until the end of the season with an option for one further year. He then became one of the top footballers on the team and married Lisa Kerr.

References

External links

Moritz Hartmann at FuPa

1986 births
Living people
German footballers
Bundesliga players
2. Bundesliga players
3. Liga players
1. FC Köln II players
FC Ingolstadt 04 players
SC Fortuna Köln players
FC Ingolstadt 04 II players
Kickers Offenbach players
Association football forwards